The Soninke–Bozo languages, Soninke and Bozo, form a branch of the Mande languages spoken across western Africa.

References

Mande languages